Jet Black Orchid is an American rock band from Louisville, Kentucky, that formed in 2012. The band is composed of brothers of Rio Brittany (guitar), Gunnar Brittany (lead vocals, bass guitar, keyboard), and Jaggar Brittany (drums, backing vocals). Their style has been compared to artists such as The Black Keys, The Raconteurs, and Led Zeppelin.

History

Jet Black Orchid was formed in early 2012. The three brothers had been playing music together previously under several different band names around Louisville, Kentucky and Indiana. They spent the early months of 2014 writing and recording their debut LP (self titled) in Nashville, Tennessee. In October 2014, they released their first single "Curious Creature" with accompanying music video off their debut LP (self titled). In spring 2015 the band embarked on a three-month North American West Coast tour followed by a homecoming show with English rock band The Struts at the Mercury Ballroom.

Discography

Albums
Jet Black Orchid (2014)

Singles
 2014 "Curious Creature"

References

External links

Rock music groups from Kentucky
Musical groups from Louisville, Kentucky
Musical groups established in 2012
American musical trios
2012 establishments in Kentucky